Voulpaix is a commune in the Aisne department in Hauts-de-France in northern France.

Population

Mayor
 Gaston Louvet: 1947-1965
 Guy Renaux: 1965-1995
 Michel Degardin: 1995-2008
 Jean-Paul Renaux: 2008–present

See also
 Communes of the Aisne department

References

Communes of Aisne
Aisne communes articles needing translation from French Wikipedia